The following is a list of bishops and archbishops of Prague. The bishopric of Prague was established in 973, and elevated to an archbishopric on 30 April 1344. The current Roman Catholic Archdiocese of Prague is the continual successor of the bishopric established in 973 (with a 140-year sede vacante in the Hussite era). In addition, the city also has an Eastern Orthodox archeparchy (archbishopric), Greek Catholic exarchate and the Prague diocese and patriarchate of the Czechoslovak Hussite Church seat in Prague.

Bishops of Prague
The names are given in Czech, with English or otherwise as suitable.

Archbishops of Prague

Orthodox bishops of Prague 
The first Orthodox mission in Czech lands was led by Saints Cyril and Methodius, some time before the East–West Schism, with its centre in Moravia. The current Czech and Slovak Orthodox Church comes from the Czech Orthodox clubs and partly arose from the early Czechoslovak Church which separated from the Roman Catholic Church in the 1920s. Consequently, the Czechoslovak Church tended towards Protestantism and an Orthodox branch split off. The Prague Archeparchy encompasses the whole of Bohemia. 
 
 Gorazd (Pavlik) of Prague 1921–1942
 (...)
 Dorotheus (Filipp) of Prague 1963–1999
 Metropolitan Christopher (Pulec) of Prague 2000–2013
 Metropolitan Rastislav (Gont) of Prague since 2013

Greek Catholic bishops of Prague 
Apostolic Exarchate in the Czech Republic was established in 2006. Exarchs: 
1. Ivan Ljavinec, 1996–2003
2. Ladislav Hučko, since 2003

Prague bishops of the Czechoslovak Church and Czechoslovak Hussite Church 
The Czechoslovak Hussite Church (until 1971 Czechoslovak Church) split off from the Roman Catholics in 1920s. Initially the church varied between Catholic modernism, Orthodoxy and Protestantism; today it is a Protestant church in principle.

Bishops of Prague Diocese: 
 Karel Farský, 1925–1927
 Gustav Adolf Procházka, 1928–1942
 Miroslav Novák, 1946–1962
 Josef Kupka, 1962–1982 (in 1971, the church was renamed to "Hussite")
 Miroslav Durchánek, 1982–1988
 René Hradský, 1989–1999
 Karel Bican 1999–2007
 David Tonzar, since 2008
 
Prague is also the seat of patriarchs. The two first Bishops of Prague were also patriarchs. Since 1946, the patriarch is a different bishop. 
 Karel Farský, 1924–1927
 Gustav Adolf Procházka, 1928–1942
 František Kovář, 1946–1961
 Miroslav Novák, 1961–1990
 Vratislav Štěpánek, 1991–1994
 Josef Špak, 1994–2001
 Jan Schwarz, 2001–2005
 Tomáš Butta, since 2006

References

973 establishments

Christianity in Prague

Prague
Bishops and archbishops of Prague